Misaka is a surname. Notable people and fictional characters with the name include:

People 
Wat Misaka (1923–2019), American basketball player

Fictional characters 
Kaori Misaka, a character in the Kanon series.
Mikoto Misaka, one of the main characters in the A Certain Magical Index series. 
Shiori Misaka, a character in the Kanon series.